A four-centered arch is a low, wide type of arch with a pointed apex. Its structure is achieved by drafting two arcs which rise steeply from each springing point on a small radius, and then turning into two arches with a wide radius and much lower springing point. It is a pointed sub-type of the general flattened depressed arch. This type of arch uses space efficiently and decoratively when used for doorways. It is also employed as a wall decoration in which arcade and window openings form part of the whole decorative surface. Two of the most notable types are known as the Persian arch, which is moderately "depressed" and found in Islamic architecture, and the Tudor arch, which is much flatter and found in English architecture. Another variant, the keel arch, has partially straight rather than curved sides and developed in Fatimid architecture.

Use in Islamic architecture
The four-centered arch is widely used in Islamic architecture, originally employed by the Abbasids and later by the Fatimids and by Persianate cultures. The earliest examples of a four-centered arch were introduced at Samarra, a purpose-built capital built by the Abbasids in the 9th century. Here they are found in the portals of the Qubbat al-Sulaiybiyya, an octagonal pavilion, and the Qasr al-'Ashiq palace. Later, the four-centered arch appeared commonly in the architecture of the Ghurid Empire, which ruled over large parts of Iran, Central Asia, and the northern Indian Subcontinent in the 12th to 13th centuries. It was very common in the architecture of the Timurid Empire and its successor states, becoming a standard form of wider Iranian architecture and later Mughal architecture. In this Persianate cultural sphere it was used for forms such as arcades, windows, gateways, and iwans. Pointed three-centered arches were also frequently used in Iran and Central Asia.

A variant of the four-centered arch, typically referred to as the "keel arch", became especially characteristic of Fatimid architecture. It is distinguished from other four-centered arches by having most of the arch's normal radius appear more straight than curved. It became standard for a while in Egyptian Islamic architecture in the 12th century. Blind keel arch niches appeared frequently as a motif of decorated façades in late Fatimid, Ayyubid, and early Mamluk architecture in Cairo.

Use in English architecture
In English architecture the arch is often known as a Tudor arch, as it was a common architectural element during the reigns of the Tudor dynasty (1485–1603), though its use predates 1485 by several decades, and from about 1550 it was out of fashion for grand buildings.  It is a blunted version of the pointed arch of Gothic architecture, of which Tudor architecture is the last phase in England.

The Tudor arch was especially used for doorways, where it gives a wide opening without taking too much space above, compared to a more pointed Gothic arch. In Tudor architecture of the grander sort it is so used when the window openings are rectangular, as for example at Hampton Court Palace. In such cases it can be even flatter than usual, and may not be four-centered in terms of geometry, with some of the upper edges effectively straight.

A notable early example is the west window of Gloucester Cathedral. There are three royal chapels and one chapel-like Abbey which show the style at its most elaborate: King's College Chapel, Cambridge; St George's Chapel, Windsor; Henry VII's Chapel at Westminster Abbey, and Bath Abbey. However, numerous simpler buildings, especially churches, built during the wool boom in East Anglia, also demonstrate the style.

When employed to frame a large church window, it lends itself to very wide spaces, decoratively filled with many narrow vertical mullions and horizontal transoms. The overall effect produces a grid-like appearance of regular, delicate, rectangular forms with an emphasis on the perpendicular, characteristic of the style, known as Perpendicular Gothic in England, of the 15th and early 16th centuries.  This is very similar to contemporary Spanish style in particular. In buildings such as Hampton Court the Tudor arch is found together with the first appearance of  Renaissance architecture in England, much later than in Italy.  In the later period it is generally only used for major decorative windows, perhaps in an oriel window, or a bay window supported on a bracket or corbel.

Notes

References

Arches and vaults
Islamic architectural elements